MKSK is an American landscape architecture and urban design firm. The company is headquartered in Columbus, Ohio.

Attributes
MKSK is headquartered in the Brewery District of Columbus, Ohio, and has six regional offices. It has approximately 100 employees.

The company CEO is Brian Kinzelman.

The company's designs aim to create pedestrian-friendly designs, including reconnecting neighborhoods divided by highways.

History
MKSK was founded in 2011, from a merger between MSI Design and KKG, both of which were founded in 1990.

In 2019, the company reorganized its ownership from being held between ten partners into an employee stock ownership plan, making its employees the owners of the company.

Designs
Since about 2000, the firm or its predecessors have designed or created master plans for nearly every public space in downtown Columbus.

Columbus
 Master plan for the Arena District
 Grandview Yard master plan and First Avenue Park
 The Scioto Mile
 Dorrian Green park
 Genoa Park
 McFerson Commons
 North Bank Park
 Scioto Audubon Metro Park and Grange Insurance Audubon Center
 Scioto Mile Promenade
 Scioto Peninsula plan
 12 bridge caps over I-70 and I-71 surrounding Downtown Columbus
 Entryways around the city's Main Library and Columbus Museum of Art
 Livingston Park and green space at Nationwide Children's Hospital
 Oval at the James Cancer Hospital
 Capitol Square streetscape design
 Discovery District streetscape design
 Central quad at the Columbus College of Art & Design
 Quarry Trails Metro Park
 Urban plan for the 15+High development in the University District
 City of Columbus municipal campus master plan
 Huntington Park
 Franklin County Courthouse and Government Center grounds
 Burnham Square park

Other cities
 Riverside Crossing Park in Dublin, Ohio
 Rose Run Park in New Albany, Ohio
 Rose Music Center in Dayton, Ohio

References

External links
 
 Interview

Architects from Columbus, Ohio
Architecture firms based in Ohio
2011 establishments in Ohio
21st-century American architects
Landscape architecture organizations
Brewery District